Jack Henry Harris (November 28, 1918 – March 14, 2017) was an American film producer and distributor. He produced The Blob (1958), 4D Man (1959), and Equinox (1970).

Biography
Harris was born to a Jewish family in Philadelphia, the son of Sara and Benny Ostravsky. His mother was from Romania and his father from Poland; the latter changed the family surname to Harris.

Harris began his career in show business as a vaudeville performer in Gus Edwards' Kiddie Revue when he was six years old. He would later work in a theatre as an usher, in a publicity department, and in the distribution field, finally later taking up a career as a producer. Harris is credited with coming up with the original motivation for his 1958 film, The Blob. Harris also worked on the TV series It's About Time and The Twilight Zone.

Harris was among the 22 people selected to be honored with a star on the Hollywood Walk of Fame in 2014, in the motion pictures category. 95 at the time of his unveiling ceremony held on February 4, 2014, he was the oldest person to be honored with a star on the Walk of Fame.

Personal life
In 1988, he married Judith "Judy" Parker; they lived in Beverly Hills.

Death
Harris died March 14, 2017, at his home in Beverly Hills, surrounded by his family, aged 98; he is survived by his two children, Lynda Resnick and Anthony Harris.

Filmography
He was a producer in all films unless otherwise noted.

Film

Miscellaneous crew

As an actor

As writer

As director

Thanks

Television

Miscellaneous crew

Book
In 2015 Harris published his first book, FATHER OF THE BLOB: The Making Of A Monster Smash & Other Hollywood Tales (TVGuestpert Publishing).

References

External links

1918 births
2017 deaths
Film producers from Pennsylvania
Jewish film people
Businesspeople from Philadelphia
American male film actors
American people of Romanian-Jewish descent
American people of Polish-Jewish descent
20th-century American businesspeople